The Ramallah Center for Human Rights Studies (RCHRS) is an independent Palestinian non-profit and non-governmental organization that advocates human rights, democracy and tolerance from a secular perspective. It conducts theoretical and applied research, publishes studies and journals, operates educational programs and workshops and undertakes advocacy work. Its headquarters are in Ramallah and it has an office in Gaza.

RCHRS monitors and raises awareness about human rights violations in Palestine and advocates the need to defend justice and basic freedoms for all.

History
RCHRS was founded in 1998 by a group of academics, researchers, lawyers and human rights activists.

Work
RCHRS aims to engender a culture of tolerance and human rights by supporting inter-religious, inter-cultural and non-violent dialogue. It also advocates educational rights and academic freedoms in Palestinian educational institutions. RCHRS seeks to strengthen civil liberties, the freedom of belief, opinion, and expression and media freedom in Palestine by documenting their violations and advocating for their protection. The goals of the organization include the advancement of secularism and pluralism in Palestinian society and to raise awareness and support for democratic processes and good governance.

RCHRS has a wide network of researchers and associated institutions that enables it to reach isolated and marginalized areas and to cooperate on human rights and tolerance issues.

Applied and Theoretical Research
RCHRS relies on a wide network of researchers and associated institutions that contribute their theoretical and applied research on issues relevant to human rights and freedoms in Palestine.  Debate, constructive critiques and peer review of these studies are a crucial part of the research process. RCHRS publishes its research widely in books and reports that are distributed locally, internationally and online. These publications are of a high academic standard and are published in Arabic with an introduction in English.

Local and International Conferences, Workshops and Seminars
One key area RCHRS focuses on is facilitating dialogue between various social groups especially young people.  Recent projects include Tolerance Among University Students, a training course for students in the West Bank and Gaza. Workshop topics such as the importance of tolerance, academic freedom, democracy and civil rights were discussed.  Students from a variety of social, ideological and religious backgrounds take part.
 
RCHRS also holds monthly meetings for representatives from local and international media, civil society organizations and academic institutions.  Participants discuss recent events in Palestinian politics and the impact these events have on public security and human rights.  The goal is to encourage political leaders to adopt policies and practices that further democracy and enhance civil liberties.

Reaching Isolated and Marginalized Areas
The ongoing occupation of the West Bank, East Jerusalem, and the Gaza Strip has meant not only physical fragmentation of Palestinian society but also a social and cultural fragmentation.  As a result, RCHRS sees it as critical that the Center try and reach as many isolated and marginalized areas as possible.  This is done through a wide network of associates that work in many local communities.  
 
The political events in Gaza in June 2007 and the ongoing internal division in Palestine, prompted the center to expand its reach even further by opening a branch in Gaza.  This has allowed RCHRS to continue its activities in this volatile region ensuring that the values of tolerance, human rights and democracy continue to be communicated to all Palestinians.

Organizational structure
RCHRS's internal structure is founded upon the principle of pluralism. The staff includes secular, Muslim, Christian and Samaritan men and women with differing ideological orientations and social and economic backgrounds.

Publications
The Ramallah Center for Human Rights Studies publishes reports, articles, quarterly journals, studies, and press releases on various topics and issues concerning Palestinian and Arab society. In particular, RCHRS documents and examines the state of tolerance and human rights within these societies.

Tasamuh (Tolerance) 

The Tasamuh quarterly, first released in 2003, is an independent periodical dedicated to debates on tolerance and human rights issues in Palestine and the Arab region. It seeks to disseminate a contemporary illuminated culture through its assertion on the values of human rights and tolerance. It also tries to consider the current socio-political situation and to evaluate its impact on the reality of tolerance within the community.

Professor Iyad Barghouti, the General Director of the Ramallah Center for Human Rights Studies is the chief editor of the Tasamuh periodical.

Tasamuh consists four sections: studies and articles, reports, laws and legislations and culture. The reports section focuses on different human issues that all defend people's rights in practicing their freedoms. This is done through publishing reports that expose specific occurrences or research findings in the Arab world and discuss their impact on the state of tolerance. The laws and legislations section discusses subjects -not only theories- based on scientific research mainly related to human rights in the Arab societies. The cultural section consists of an essay on tolerance in the thought of an Arab or foreign intellectuals. This aims at demonstrating this noble concept as an ideology and as a practice.

Four issues of Tasamuh are published each year. The first issue was published in December 2003. Main language of publication is Arabic.

Writers of Tasamuh
In addition to Palestinian writers, Tasamuh is also open to writers from the whole Arab world as well as to writers from the Diaspora. Recent issues included material written by authors from Lebanon, Saudi Arabia and Jordan as well as Arab writers living in France and UK. Young writers and researchers are contribute to Tasamuh.

Journal Distribution
Tasamuh journal has become one of the most demanded journals for local libraries, academic and cultural institutions in Palestine and throughout the Arab world.

The journal's distribution reaches libraries of all districts, interested ministries, university libraries and civil society organizations, RCHRS partner groups throughout the Arab world.

Studies

2010
 Tolerance in the Arab World: Between Religion and Secularism
 Palestinian-Israeli Negotiations: An Aim or a Means?
 Historical Roots of Sectarianism in Lebanon
 The Conditions of Palestinian Refugees in Lebanon
 Political Islam in the Palestinian Refugee Camps in Lebanon
 Palestinian press: Three Hammers and an Anvil
 Tolerance in the Arab World 2009-2010
 The “Other” in Arab Press
 Sect and Sectarianism: Citizenship and Identity
 Implementing Islamic Law between the Value of Man and the Value of the Text
 Peace Negotiations and the Difficult Questions
 The Values of Tolerance in Contemporary Arab-Islamic Thought
 The "Other" in the American-centric Mentality
 Women and Religion: Towards Restoring the Feminine Voice

2009

 The West in the Eyes of the Palestinians
 Tolerance in the Arab World 2008-2009
 The Problematic Relationship between Fateh and Hamas
 Shedding Light on the Leftist Revolutionary Party
 Palestine Under Occupation: between the "Police Station" and the "Mosque"
 Jeep or Independence? About Palestinian Indecisiveness Regarding International Aid
 The Ancient Palestinian Archeology as the Battleground for the Relationship between the West and the Arabs
 The New American Policy in the Middle East: The Dialectic of Ideology & Pragmatism
 The Issue is Larger than a Dispute over the Government
 The National Dialogue: A Problem of Debate or Debates?
 The Panorama of the Palestinian Dialogue: A Journey of Hardships that May Miss the Healing Road
 Gaza: The Politics of Polarization (Axes) and the Neo-Ottomans
 The War on Gaza: A Deepening of the Split or a Justification for a Reconciliation?
 Security and Peace from an Israeli Perspective
 The Current Situation of the PLO: The Headings of Development and Restructuring

2008

 Iraqi-American Security Agreement: From the Occupation to the Occupation
 Lebanese Diaries in the Year 2008
 Democratic Transformation in Jordan: Between Security and Demography
 The Arab Peace Initiative: Purpose and Prospect
 The Controversial Relationship between Resistance and the Agenda of National Liberation
 Palestinian Party System: Identity Crisis or a Failure in Political Practice
 Where does Palestinian Opposition Stand in Relation to the Changes that are Taking Place Locally and Regionally
 Freedom of Expression for Women between Illusion and Reality
 The Role of Factional Media in Igniting Internal Conflicts
 Institution Reform as an Entrance to the Development of Media
 Fiqh Discourse Concerning the Incidents Following Hamas's Transition from Opposing the Palestinian Authority to Being Part of It
 The New Gazan Conditions and Palestinian Women
 Training Manual on Tolerance and the Right to Belief
 Palestinian Media Women: an Experience and a Creativity
 The Political participation of Palestinian youth: Shades of the Past Recapturing the Future
 Secularism and Fundamentalism in Arab Society
 Democratic Transformation in Palestine: Reasons of its Retreat and Hindrances Facing its Advancement
 International Conference on Libraries from a Human Rights Perspective Proceedings

2007

 Reviving the Refugees Issue in Research and Politics
 Palestine Refugees Without Official Documents
 Palestinians in the Arab's Gulf between Luxury and Homesickness
 The Separation Wall: Last Episode in the Judaization of Jerusalem
 Jerusalem between Zionism and Judaism
 Jerusalem: Forty Years of Occupation and Inclusion
 We Miss Democracy and Its National Culture
 Sounding Ups and Down of the Left
 The Effect of Occupation on the Realities of Palestinian Education
 Media and the Tides of Falling and Rising
 Palestinian Political Culture: A Culture Unification or Disintegration?
 Extreme Polarization and the Tendency to Eliminate the "Other"
 Election Laws and their Role in Activating the Role of Palestinian Political Parties
 Media Plaything & Bloody Discourse in Palestine
 Tolerance in Edward Said's Thought
 Religion and State in Palestine
 Arabs and Secularism

2006
 Role of the Palestinian NGOs on the Development Process
 A Critical Perspective of the Education Administrative System
 Palestinian Students Movement: Reality or Imaginary
 Media and the Challenges of "Security Chaos"
 The Palestinian Political System - From Liberalism to Alienation
 The International Community and the Political Discourse to Hamas Government
 Academic Specializations and the Needs of the Job Market
 The Performance of Courts and the Current Crisis
 Loss or Gain - No Immunity to Anybody

2005
 Political Parties: A Controversial Reality
 Good Governance and Building Civil Society Institutions
 The Culture of Tolerance in the Palestinian Curriculum
 Palestinian Left-wing Crisis: A Passing Station or a Start of the End?
 Palestinian Left-wing: Where To Go?
 The Palestinian Constitution: The Relationship between Religion and the State
 Palestinian Christians and the Arabization of the Orthodox Church
 Political Islam and Women's Issues
 Palestinian Political System: Reality and Perspectives
 Local Elections between Tribalism and Political Pluralism
 Gender Reading in Results of Palestinian Local Elections
 The Religious Space: A Perspective for Reform
 The Role of the Religious Leaders in the Aftermath of the Israeli Withdrawal from the Gaza Strip
 Religious Media Discourse and Human Rights

2004
 Culture and Modernity in Palestinian Society
 Cultural Presentation in Cartoons
 Palestinian Theater: Facts and Expectations
 The Culture of Tolerance in Opposition with the Culture of Violence
 Opinions of Youth on the Peace Process: Performance of PNA and Elections
 Reality of Political Participation of Palestinian Women
 Gender and Development Dilemma in Palestine
 Status of Women in civics Curricula for the First Basic Grade through Sixth Grade
 Political Pluralism & One-Party Regime
 Palestinian Publishing & Print Law Political Pluralism
 Tolerance & Equality in Palestinian Curriculum
 Religious Thought and Human Rights

2003
 Tolerance: Historical and Conceptual Analogy
 Tolerance and Human Rights in Ahmad Shawqi's Poem
 Jews Image in Elias Khoury Literature
 Open Education and its Role in Encouraging Women to Learn
 Sovereignty between Theory and Practice in Palestinian Constitutional Law
 Right to Education between Reality and Ambitions
 Relationships between Media and Tolerance
 Palestinian Refugees between International Law & Political Negotiations
 PLC and Enhancing Democracy
 The Palestinian National Council: Democratic Track and Future Horizons
 Cultural Dilemma in Palestine
 Israeli Occupation and Violations of Religious Rights
 Palestinian Women: Which Reform and Which Change?
 Role of the Youth in Societal Change
 Effect of Educational Process on the Learner's Character in the Palestinian Community
 On Religious Higher Education and Human Rights
 Freedom of Opinion and Expression: the Palestinian Experience
 Concepts of Good Governance in Palestine: Experience in Local Governance
 Islamization and Politics in the Palestinian Occupied Territories
 Gender Participation in Palestine: A Critical Overview
 Friday Speech and Human Rights

2002
 Human Rights Training Manual
 Academic Freedom in Palestine: a practical input for change
 Human Rights in Higher Religious Education Curricula in Palestine
 The Judicial Authority Reality in Palestine in the Light of International and Local Law: Theory and Perspective
 Palestinian Women between Siege and Social Rights
 Human Rights in Palestinian Basic Law

2001

2000
 Municipal and Local Council Elections in Palestine: Positions and Attitudes
 The Right to Education: Concept and Experience in Palestine
 Palestinian-Israeli Security Needs: From Reciprocity to Selectivity
 Palestinian Teachers and Future Aims
 Aspects of Palestinian Water Rights
 Palestinian Refugees: A Negotiation Problem or A Strategic Stalemate
 Beyond the Final Status Solution

1999

1998
Other Studies
 Prospects of Economic Development in the Occupied Palestinian Territories
 Gender Participation in Palestine: A Critical Overview
 Friday Speech and Human Rights

Activities
"Towards Ideological and Political Tolerance among university students"

Tolerance (Tasamuh) Art Exhibition

The Ramallah Center for Human Rights Studies holds an annual Tolerance (Tasaumh) Art Exhibition. The exhibition gathers young Palestinian and Arab artists though cultural art workshops and activities themed around concepts of tolerance. The annual event exhibits poster art displaying symbols of tolerance and acceptance of cultural and religious diversity.

Networks

Arab Network for Tolerance
The Arab Network for Tolerance is a regional network established by RCHRS in June 2008 to serve as a forum where activists, academics, media professionals and youth can come together to identify new strategies for improving the human rights situation in the region. The founding of the Arab Network for Tolerance was announced at a press conference held at the Lebanese Journalists' Union in Beirut on 2 September 2008. This project coincides with RCHRS's decision to broaden its work outside Palestine, and is part of RCHRS's efforts to reach a wider audience in its work of diffusing the concepts and values of tolerance.

The Network aims to disseminate the culture, values and concepts of tolerance and counter fundamentalism, violence and division,  trends seen throughout Arab countries today. The Network's stated goal is to “actively contribute to building more tolerant societies in the Arab world”. RCHRS expects that this association of individuals and organisations will be the start of a moderate, secular and effective movement in the Arab countries that can positively influence and develop a variety of sectors in the Arab world, including education, civil society and media.

Anticipated outcomes of the Network include:

 Finding ways to challenge destructive fundamentalist trends and approaches
 Reaching marginalised groups with the values of tolerance and human rights
 Revitalizing conventional approaches to human rights and good governance by  introducing the concepts of tolerance and diversity into these discourses.

The Network started with pre-identified groups in six Arab countries (Yemen, Egypt, Tunisia, Morocco, Lebanon and Palestine) that shared a basic understanding of the concept of tolerance. The Network is open for organisations and individuals who wish to join and will eventually extend to more Arab countries.

RCHRS coordinates the Network and is responsible for developing its conceptual and practical framework and for taking a leading role in steering its work. The Network includes a range of structured activities, including training sessions, regional meetings, conferences and publications.

See also
 Human Rights
 Toleration

References

External links
 Ramallah Center for Human Rights (RCHRS) (Official Website)
 Arab Network for Tolerance (ANT)

Human rights organizations based in the State of Palestine
Organizations based in Ramallah
Secularism in the State of Palestine